The 2008 Asian Indoor Athletics Championships was an international indoor athletics event took place in Doha, Qatar, between 14 and 16 February.

Results

Men

Women

Medal table

Participating nations
A total of 29 nations were represented by athletes competing at the 2008 championships.

 (10)
 (16)
 (3)
 (6)
 (31)
 (3)
 (5)
 (3)
 (12)
 (2)
 (23)
 (8)
 (4)
 (2)
 (2)
 (1)
 (3)
 (2)
 (3)
 (5)
 (1)
 (19)
 (11)
 (3)
 (3)
 (3)
 (12)
 (3)
 (3)

References

Results – Day 1
Results – Day 2 (archived)
Results – Day 3 (archived)

External links
Official website (archived)
Asian Athletics Association

Indoor 2008
Asian Indoor Championships
Asian Indoor Athletics Championships
2008 in Asian sport
International athletics competitions hosted by Qatar